The 2022 Halle Open (known for sponsorship reasons as the Terra Wortmann Open) was a tennis tournament played on outdoor grass courts. It was the 29th edition of the Halle Open and part of the ATP Tour 500 series of the 2022 ATP Tour. It took place at the OWL Arena in Halle, Germany, between 13 and 19 June 2022.

Champions

Singles

  Hubert Hurkacz def.  Daniil Medvedev, 6–1, 6–4

Doubles

  Marcel Granollers /  Horacio Zeballos def.  Tim Pütz /  Michael Venus, 6–4, 6–7(5–7), [14–12]

Points and prize money

Points distribution

Prize money 

*per team

Singles main draw entrants

Seeds

1 Rankings are as of 6 June 2022.

Other entrants
The following players received wildcards into the main draw:
  Nick Kyrgios  
  Henri Squire
  Jan-Lennard Struff 

The following player received entry as a special exempt:
  Oscar Otte

The following players received entry from the qualifying draw:
  Radu Albot
  Maxime Cressy
  Tallon Griekspoor
  Marc-Andrea Hüsler

Withdrawals
Before the tournament
  Lloyd Harris → replaced by  Daniel Altmaier
  Jannik Sinner → replaced by  Mackenzie McDonald
  Alexander Zverev → replaced by  Benjamin Bonzi

Doubles main draw entrants

Seeds

1 Rankings are as of 6 June 2022.

Other entrants
The following pairs received wildcards into the doubles main draw:
  Daniel Altmaier  /  Oscar Otte
  Dustin Brown /  Dominic Stricker

The following pair received entry from the qualifying draw:
  Ariel Behar  /  Gonzalo Escobar

The following pairs received entry as lucky losers:
  Tallon Griekspoor /  Alex Molčan
  Yannick Hanfmann /  Jan-Lennard Struff

Withdrawals
  Ariel Behar /  Gonzalo Escobar → replaced by  Tallon Griekspoor /  Alex Molčan
  Andrey Rublev /  Alexander Zverev → replaced by  Yannick Hanfmann /  Jan-Lennard Struff

References

External links 
 Official website

 
Halle Open
Halle Open
Halle Open
Halle Open